Amnionless is a protein that in humans is encoded by the AMN gene.

Function  

A complex of amnionless and cubilin forms the cubam receptor.

The protein encoded by this gene is a type I transmembrane protein. It is thought to modulate bone morphogenetic protein (BMP) receptor function by serving as an accessory or coreceptor, and thus facilitates or hinders BMP binding. It is known that the mouse AMN gene is expressed in the extraembryonic visceral endoderm layer during gastrulation, but it is found to be mutated in amnionless mouse. The encoded protein has sequence similarity to short gastrulation (Sog) and procollagen IIA proteins in Drosophila.

Clinical significance 

Mutations of the AMN gene may cause Imerslund–Gräsbeck syndrome.

References

External links

Further reading